"Say" is a song by John Mayer written for the Rob Reiner film The Bucket List in 2007. The ballad was released as a single on November 20, 2007, and was the first commercial single in Mayer's career that was not originally released on one of his albums but added to the special edition re-release of his album Continuum. In the US, it is Mayer's highest-charting single, reaching number 12 on the Billboard Hot 100 in May 2008. The song earned Mayer his record-tying fourth and final Grammy Award for Best Male Pop Vocal Performance.

Overview
The music video for "Say" was directed by music video director Vem. The song is also referred to as "Say (What You Need to Say)" as this is the main line from the chorus of the song. The song was also the first "assignment" song that Mayer had ever written. He notes that when writing the song "I don't know how much harder it gets than to see a beautiful, bittersweet movie and then have to write a song that matches the tone." Mayer posted the song on his official blog on November 16.

Critical reception
Chuck Taylor of Billboard called "Say" a "lilting, bittersweet ballad" and said that it "is bound to be another staple for the [AC] format."
In 2009, the song won a Grammy Award for Best Male Pop Vocal Performance at the 51st Grammy Awards. It was also nominated for Best Song Written for a Motion Picture, Television or Other Visual Media.

Commercial and chart performance
In the US, "Say" peaked at number twelve in May 2008 on the Billboard Hot 100 chart and number eight on the Hot Digital Songs chart, surpassing his debut single, "No Such Thing", as his highest-peaking Hot 100 single. It was certified platinum by the RIAA, and has sold over 2 million copies in the US. It also peaked at number seventeen on the Pop 100 chart and number six on the Hot Adult Top 40 Tracks chart.

"Say" debuted on the Australian ARIA Singles Chart at number fifty-six, and climbed to its peak of number forty-seven the following week. On the Canadian Hot 100, it peaked at number twenty-seven.

Weekly charts

Year-end charts

Certifications

References

2000s ballads
2007 singles
2007 songs
Columbia Records singles
Grammy Award for Best Male Pop Vocal Performance
John Mayer songs
Songs written by John Mayer
Songs written for films